Station.com was Sony Online Entertainment's portal that was the home to its many PC, console, casual and mobile games. It is the home to many MMOs including EverQuest, EverQuest II, The Matrix Online, PlanetSide, and Star Wars Galaxies, which have gained hundreds of thousands of paid subscribers.

While Station.com offers many free online games and trials, there are many "pay-to-play" games that require a "Station Subscription".

As a convenience to its subscribers, Daybreak provides a "all-in-one" packaged subscription called "Station Access" that provides access to all of its premium games.

Arcade Games
Multiplayer (M), Downloadable (D), Browser Based (B)

Astropop D, B
Cosmic Rift D, M
Diner Dash D
Feeding Frenzy D, B
Heavy Weapon D, B
Infantry (computer game) D, M
Insaniquarium D, B
Luxor D
Tanarus D, M
Tumblebugs D
Zuma GO! D, B

PuzzleGames
Multiplayer (M), Downloadable (D), Browser Based (B)

Alchemy Deluxe D, B
Bejeweled 2 D, B
Bewitched D, B
Bounce Out Blitz D, B
Charm Tale D
Chuzzle Deluxe D
Dynomite! D
Fresco Wizard D
Jewel Quest D
Mah Jong Medley D, B
Mah Jong Quest D
Oasis D
Puzzle Inlay D
Rocket Mania D
Shape Shifer D, B
Super Collapse II D, B
Super Game House Solitaire Vol. 1 D, B
The Da Vinci Code D
Tumblebugs D, B

Trivia Games
Multiplayer (M), Downloadable (D), Browser Based (B)

Bonnie's Bookstore D
Bookworm D
JEOPARDY! D, B
JEOPARDY! 2 D
Rock & Roll JEOPARDY! D, B
Super Text Twist D, B
Wheel of Fortune D, B
Wheel of Fortune 2 D
Word Slinger D

Strategy Games
Multiplayer (M), Downloadable (D), Browser Based (B)

Pirates Constructible Strategy Game Online M, D
Stargate Online Trading Card Game M, D
Star Chamber: The Harbinger Saga M, D

MMO Games

Cosmic Rift D, M
EverQuest D, M
EverQuest II D, M
Free Realms B, M
Infantry D, M
PlanetSide D, M
Star Wars Galaxies D, M
Tanarus D, M
The Matrix Online D, M
Vanguard: Saga of Heroes D, M
DC Universe Online D, M

References

External links
Station.com
Station Access
Station Players
Station Exchange

Sony Interactive Entertainment
Sony subsidiaries
Browser-based game websites
Companies based in San Diego County, California
Entertainment companies of the United States
Entertainment companies of Japan